100,000,000 Bon Jovi Fans Can't Be Wrong is a boxed set released in 2004 on Island Records. A collection of demos and B-sides, it was released to celebrate Bon Jovi's twentieth anniversary and the milestone of the band selling 100 million records worldwide.

Content
The box set consists of 4 CDs, and also includes a DVD of the band talking about the tracks and additional archive candid footage of the band. Additionally, the Japanese version of the box set also includes a fifth CD. The box set charted at #53 on the Billboard 200.

Apart from songs released as iTunes singles "The Radio Saved My Life Tonight" was released as a promo CD single for the box set. The song was since played extensively on the bands following Have a Nice Day Tour.

The box set includes the songs "Real Life" and "Good Guys Don't Always Wear White" which were previously released as singles for soundtrack albums but never featured on a Bon Jovi album until now. "Edge of a Broken Heart" was also previously released for a soundtrack album and the Slippery When Wet 2-CD Special Edition Bonus CD (PHCR-90015/6) in 1998.

The album title and the cover art is a play on the 1959 Elvis Presley compilation 50,000,000 Elvis Fans Can't Be Wrong.

Track listing

Best of the Boxset (Single disc version)
The Best of the Boxset compilation album (a 10 track sampler) is very rare but available. It features the 10 best tracks from all the CDs of the box set on one single CD.

Track listing

Personnel
Band members
Jon Bon Jovi – lead vocals, acoustic guitar
Richie Sambora – lead guitar, backing vocals, talk box
Hugh McDonald – bass, backing vocals
Alec John Such – bass, backing vocals
Tico Torres – drums, percussion, backing vocals
David Bryan – keyboards, backing vocals

Additional musicians
Bobby Bandiera – rhythm guitar, backing vocals

Charts

Certifications

References

Albums produced by Patrick Leonard
Albums produced by Andy Johns
Albums produced by Richie Sambora
B-side compilation albums
Bon Jovi compilation albums
2004 compilation albums